The Diamond Calk Horseshoe Company of Duluth, Minnesota, USA was founded in 1908 by blacksmith Otto Swanstrom.

Initially manufacturing horseshoes with a special type of calk to improve the animals' foothold on slippery surfaces, the company successfully adapted to the development of motorised transport for the masses and produced a range of adjustable wrenches and pliers from the 1920s. The family-owned company was sold to the Triangle Corporation in 1981; Triangle itself was eventually sold to Cooper Tools.

In 1994, the last workers vacated. The building was demolished in 1996.

Gallery

References 

1908 establishments in Minnesota
Demolished buildings and structures in Minnesota
Buildings and structures demolished in 1996
Defunct manufacturing companies based in Minnesota